The Ministry of Inclusion, Social Security and Migration is a department of the government of Spain responsible for planning and carrying out the government policy on Social Security, foreigners, immigration and emigration.

The Ministry's purpose is to guarantee a sufficient and sustainable pension system, to establish new inclusive policies that reduce inequality, uncertainty and social exclusion and to develop a new legal framework to order and give security for migrants. The major policy planned by the ministry is to establish and manage a 'vital minimum income'.

The department was created by Prime Minister Pedro Sánchez as part of the Sánchez II Government and it took on some of the responsibilities of the Ministry of Labour, Migrations and Social Security; as well as the responsibilities of the Ministry of Finance in civil servants' pensions. It is overseen by the Minister of Inclusion, Social Security and Migration, currently José Luis Escrivá, who was appointed on 13 January 2020.

Structure 
This Ministry is structured in the following higher bodies:
 The Secretariat of State for Social Security and Pensions
 The Directorate-General for Social Security Management
 The Office of the Comptroller General of the Social Security
The Secretariat of State for Migration
 The Directorate-General for Migration
 The Directorate-General for Humanitarian Attention and Social Inclusion of Immigrants
 The Directorate-General for the Management of the International and Temporary Protection Reception System
The Deputy Directorate-General for Migration Analysis
The Deputy Directorate-General for Economic Management and European Funds
The Deputy Directorate-General for Legal Regime
 The General Secretariat for Objectives and Policies of Social Inclusion and Forecast
The Deputy Directorate-General for Inclusion Objectives and Indicators
The Deputy Directorate-General for Inclusion Policies
 The Undersecretariat
 The Technical General Secretariat

Agencies 

 The National Institute for Social Security
 The Social Institute for Sea Workers
 The Social Security General Treasury
 The Social Security IT Department
 The Legal Service of the Social Security Administration
 The Permanent Observatory of Immigration

List of officeholders
Office name:
Ministry of Inclusion, Social Security and Migration (2020–present)

References

Ministries established in 2020
2020 establishments in Spain
Social Security